Erik Carlsson Boheman (19 January 1895 – 18 September 1979), was a Swedish diplomat and politician for the Liberal People's Party.

Early life and education
Boheman was born in Stockholm, the son of Ellen Gustava (née Abramson) and Carl Helmar Boheman. His paternal grandfather was entomologist Carl Henrik Boheman. His nephew was actor Erland Josephson. His mother was Jewish. Boheman studied at the Stockholm University College and graduated in 1918 with a Master of Laws degree.

Biography

In 1918, he was appointed attaché to the Swedish foreign mission in Paris, and the following year to London. In 1920, he got a permanent position at the Swedish Ministry for Foreign Affairs, and during the beginning of the 1930s he was Sweden's envoy to Istanbul, Sofia, Athens, Warsaw and Bucharest. In 1938, he was appointed State Secretary for Foreign Affairs and held that position during World War II, up until 1945. During the war he was also Sweden's envoy to Paris, so the Deputy State Secretary for Foreign Affairs, Vilhelm Assarsson, had to step in as Acting Secretary on a number of occasions. He was appointed Ambassador of Sweden to the United Kingdom 1947–48, and Ambassador to the United States 1948–58. He was nominated for Secretary-General of the United Nations in the 1953 selection, but he declined the nomination.  After World War II, Boheman falsely stated that "ignorant and over-diligent American economic spies" had "accused the Wallenberg group unjustly of having acted in collusion with the Germans" related to Bosch interests.  In fact, this group helped cloak Nazi Germany's interests in the United States.

He was a member of the Riksdag 1959–1970 for the Liberal People's Party, the Gothenburg constituency, where he sat in the First Chamber of the then-bicameral Riksdag. He was Speaker of the First Chamber from 1965 until 1970, when the two Chambers merged into one.

Alongside his political mandates Boheman was also chairman of the board of directors of Saab Automobile (1958–1970), Skandinaviska Enskilda Banken and several other companies within the heavy industry sector.

Family and death
Boheman was married two times. His first marriage was to countess Gunilla Wachtmeister 1919–1927, daughter of university chancellor, count Fredik Wachtmeister and baroness Louise af Uggla, and secondly to Margaret Mattson 1932–1979(his death) daughter of wholesaler Allan Mattsson and Karin Danielsson. Erik Boheman is great-grandfather to actor Richard Ulfsäter.
Erik Boheman died on 18 September 1979 in Gränna, Sweden.

Awards
He received honorary degrees at Gustavus Adolphus College, Saint Peter's College, Augustana College (Illinois), Tufts College and the Uppsala University.

On 6 June 1968, he received the Royal Order of the Seraphim.

In popular culture
In the Sveriges Television movie, Fyra dagar som skakade Sverige (Four Days that shook Sweden - The Midsummer Crisis 1941), 1988, the role of Boheman is played by Swedish actor Lars-Erik Berenett.

References

Bibliography
 

Members of the Riksdag from the Liberals (Sweden)
Stockholm University alumni
1895 births
1979 deaths
Speakers of the Riksdag
Politicians from Stockholm
Swedish people of Jewish descent
Ambassadors of Sweden to Turkey
Ambassadors of Sweden to Greece
Ambassadors of Sweden to Bulgaria
Ambassadors of Sweden to Poland
Ambassadors of Sweden to Romania
Ambassadors of Sweden to France
Ambassadors of Sweden to the United Kingdom
Ambassadors of Sweden to the United States
Speakers of Första kammaren
Members of the Första kammaren